Miyazaki Prefecture held a gubernatorial by-election on January 21, 2007. Former governor Tadahiro Ando was arrested for bid-rigging. Independent comedian Hideo Higashikokubaru (running under the name "Higashi Sonomanma") won.

References 
 Official results, results
 Official results, voter turnout 
 ザ･選挙　-選挙情報-

2007 elections in Japan
Gubernatorial elections in Japan
January 2007 events in Japan
Politics of Miyazaki Prefecture